Yang Yilun (born May 10, 1951), also spelled Yang Yi-lun, is a 7 dan professional Go player, teacher, and author, with special expertise in the formulation of "tsume-go" (life-and-death) problems. For many years he has served as the professional Go player of the Cotsen Go Tournament, the largest annual Go tournament in southern California.

He became a professional in 1966, at the age of 14.
He began teaching in the United States in 1986, and is the chief instructor of the American Go Institute in Los Angeles, California. He has taught hundreds of students from Canada, Germany, Hong Kong, Poland, Singapore, Taiwan, and the United States.

His co-author Philip Straus wrote: "Mr. Yang has a comprehensive understanding of the meaning of josekis. More importantly, he has developed a method to transfer that understanding to amateur players who grope about in a fog of confusion when trying to puzzle out even the simplest joseki."

He has created hundreds of life-and-death problems. He also has translated multiple Go books from Japanese into Chinese.

He enjoys "sports and cooking Chinese food."

Bibliography

References

External links
Yang Yilun, at Sensei's Library

Living people
Chinese Go players
Go (game) writers
1952 births